The 1901 Toronto Argonauts season was the Argonaut Football Club's 4th season of organized league play since joining the Ontario Rugby Football Union in 1898. The team won the first league championship in club history, finishing in first place in the senior series of the ORFU with five wins and one loss. The Argos also defeated the University of Toronto, that season's intercollegiate champions, in a two-game series for the city championship.

In their first trip to the Dominion championship the Argonauts were beaten 18-3 in Montreal by Ottawa College, champions of the Quebec Rugby Football Union, seven days after the two teams had played to a 12–12 tie.

Regular season

Standings

Schedule

Postseason

References

Toronto Argonauts seasons